Carles Blasi Vidal  (born February 21, 1964) is an Andorran politician. He is a member of the Social Democratic Party (Andorra).

External links

Page at the General Council of the Principality of Andorra

Members of the General Council (Andorra)
1964 births
Living people
Social Democratic Party (Andorra) politicians
Place of birth missing (living people)
21st-century Andorran politicians